The Coombabah Lake Conservation Park is a conservation park that is an Important Wetland in Australia, located in the Gold Coast region of South East Queensland, Australia. Part of the Coomera River catchment, Lake Coombabah is a tidal lake at the mouth of Coombabah Creek. The Coombabah wetlands are significant because they are the most southerly lake and coastal swampland representatives in the bioregion, and because the area provides significant wildlife value and refuge habitat. The conservation area includes tidal marshlands and mangroves along part of the lakes edge. The Melaleuca boardwalk allows viewing of the wildlife. The mangroves are home to frogs, crabs and fish that attract native and migratory birds. There are  guided bushwalking and canoeing activities as part of community conservation and environmental workshops to promote local conservation.

Location and features

The lake is fed by Coombabah Creek which rises to the west in the Nerang Forest Reserve.  The Ivan Gibbs Wetlands Reserve and Lakeside Country Club golf course are both located to the south of the lake.  Houses in Helensvale have been built a short distance from the lake's western shore.

The Park safeguards close to 1200 hectares of wetland, eucalypt forest, mangrove habitat and salt marsh and acts as habitat for migratory birds. It has many endangered species of animals including grey-headed flying fox, koalas, powerful owl and various internationally protected migratory birds.

See also

 Protected areas of Queensland
 Moreton Bay Marine Park

References

External links
Gold Coast City Council Fishing Platform
Pictures- National Library of Australia
Estuary Assessment Framework for Non-Pristine Estuaries: Coombabah Lake

Conservation parks of Queensland
Wetlands of Queensland
Coombabah Lake
Geography of Gold Coast, Queensland
DIWA-listed wetlands